Kelly D. Holstine (born 17 December 1973) is an American educator, teacher trainer, public speaker, writer, Equity 2.0 consultant, and the owner of WordHaven BookHouse, LLC, in Sheboygan, Wisconsin. She was formerly an English teacher at the Tokata Learning Center, an alternative high school in Shakopee, Minnesota, and an adjunct professor at Augsburg University. She was named the 2018/2019 Minnesota Teacher of the Year by Education Minnesota.

Biography

Early life
Holstine is a native of Fairmont, Minnesota, graduating from Fairmont Public Schools in 1992. Among other influential teachers, Holstine credits Paula Thiede, her fifth-grade teacher at Lincoln Elementary School, for making her feel like she mattered, that she was intelligent and loved, and inspired her personal teaching philosophy of "Every Heart Matters."

Education
After receiving a Bachelor of Arts degree in Communications from the University of Massachusetts, she worked at print and television media outlets before turning to social work as a case manager for students who dropped out of high school. She received her Communication Arts & Literature teaching license in 2007 and her Master of Arts in education in 2011, both from Augsburg University in Minneapolis, Minnesota.

Career as an educator
Holstine taught Communication Arts & English Literature courses, advised Gender Sexuality Alliances, and facilitated Link Crew Programs at Chaska High School in Chaska, Minnesota, and St. Anthony Village High School in St. Anthony, Minnesota, before becoming a founding member of Tokata Learning Center. There she taught Communication Arts & English Literature courses to students between 9th and 12th grade, was a Curriculum Writer for the Success for the Future Grant, and was the advisor for the MAAP Stars student leadership program. Tokata Learning Center is an alternative high school that serves 9th to 12th grade in Shakopee and surrounding areas. In her Teacher of the Year application, Holstine wrote this about her students at Tokata: "It is true that our population can consist of students with varying abilities and temperaments, but these same students are also some of the most creative and brilliant humans with whom I have ever worked.  And, without fail, the students who arrive angry, sad, hurt, and/or scared reveal their vulnerability, brilliance, and beautiful selves when they feel safe and valued." One year after being named Minnesota Teacher of the Year, Holstine shifted to training teachers and teachers-in-training (among other adults).

Holstine began her Equity 2.0 Consulting business  in 2018 and consciously uses an Intersectional Equity lens in her work.

On July 8, 2019, OutFront Minnesota announced Holstine had been hired as the LGBTQ+ civil rights group's Director of Educational Equity. On June 26, 2020, Holstine resigned from OutFront MN.

Holstine was an adjunct education professor at Augsburg University from September 2020 - May 2021.

Holstine's Independent BookShop and Writing Center, WordHaven BookHouse, opened on 4/30/22 in Sheboygan, WI.

Teacher of the Year
In the Fall of 2017 Holstine was nominated by Shakopee Public Schools professional learning coordinator Annie Rients and Tokata Learning Center principal Eric Serbus for Education Minnesota's Minnesota Teacher of the Year award, one of 167 candidates nominated across the state. She was among 43 semifinalists and 12 finalists. She was named Minnesota Teacher of the Year on May 6, 2018. Holstine is the first out member of the Rainbow Community to be named Minnesota Teacher of the Year and only the second Alternative Educator. She is the 54th recipient of the award and the first from the Shakopee district.

In one of Holstine's responses posed by the Education Minnesota panel, she explained her teaching practice: "I chose to be a teacher at a non-traditional age. Ten years later, my teaching practice still strongly matches this philosophy: teaching individuals to effectively solve problems, allowing students to learn by doing, giving students an active role in the learning process, and valuing the process of learning more than the outcome, respecting the whole of the child and creating a ‘community of learners’ – as opposed to a collection of discrete individuals."

As the 2018 award winner, in 2019 Holstine was Minnesota's representative for the National Teacher of the Year program in Washington, D.C. She chose not to attend to protest the policies of President Donald Trump, saying those policies frequently hurt her students who face discrimination.

Holstine chose to kneel during the national anthem at the NCAA football championship game on January 13, 2020 as a way to support the BLM movement and to advocate for marginalized and oppressed people.  Holstine explained her reasons for kneeling in an article published in The Independent and in her TED-Ed Talk.

Awards
 2018/2019 Minnesota Teacher of the Year 
 2018 Minnesota Women Breaking Barriers Winter Honoree 
 2019 MN Lynx Women's Spotlight Selection for Leader and Innovator in Arts and Education 
 2019 MN Women's Press Favorite Leader in Education

References

External links
 "Welcome Home Kelly Holstine, Teacher of the Year!" (May 7, 2018)  Shakopee Public Schools YouTube channel
 "The 2018 Minnesota Teacher of the Year finalists" (May 9, 2018)  Education Minnesota YouTube channel
 "2018 Minnesota Teacher of the Year (The Mary Hanson Show)" (Sept. 16, 2018)  Mary Hanson YouTube channel
 Past recipients of Minnesota Teacher of the Year award  Education Minnesota website

Living people
1973 births
Educators from Minnesota
American women educators
People from Fairmont, Minnesota
University of Massachusetts alumni
Augsburg University alumni
LGBT people from Minnesota
American lesbians
21st-century American women